Sogndal is a municipality in Vestland county, Norway. It is located on the northern shore of the Sognefjorden in the traditional district of Sogn. The village of Hermansverk is the administrative center of Sogndal municipality. Other villages include Kaupanger, Kjørnes, Fimreite, Nornes, and Fjærland.

The Norwegian dialect spoken in Sogndal is called sognamål.

In 1917, a farmer in Sogndal (Kato Linde) plowed up the Eggja stone, a gravestone with runic inscriptions important for the history of the Old Norse language.

The  municipality is the 84th largest by area out of the 356 municipalities in Norway. Sogndal is the 96th most populous municipality in Norway with a population of 12,097.

General information

Sogndal was established as a municipality on 1 January 1838 (see formannskapsdistrikt law). The original municipality was identical to the Sogndal parish (prestegjeld) with the sub-parishes of Stedje, Norane, and Kaupanger.

During the 1960s, there were many municipal mergers across Norway due to the work of the Schei Committee. On 1 January 1964, the Tingstad area (population: 5) was transferred from Leikanger Municipality to Sogndal Municipality. On 1 January 2000, the sub-parish of Fjærland was transferred from Balestrand Municipality to Sogndal because of the completion of the Frudal Tunnel which connected the previously isolated area of Fjærland to Sogndal rather than Balestrand.

On 1 January 2020, a major municipal merger took place. Sogndal Municipality (population: 8,191) was merged with Leikanger Municipality (population: 2,331) and most of Balestrand Municipality (except for the Nesse area which was merged into Høyanger Municipality) to form a much larger municipality called Sogndal. On the same date the administrative centre was moved from Sogndalsfjøra to Hermansverk. Also on that date, the municipality became part of the newly created Vestland county after Sogn og Fjordane and Hordaland counties were merged.

Name
The Old Norse form of the name was Sóknardalr. The first element is the genitive case of the river name Sókn (now called Sogndalselvi), the last element is dalr which means "valley" or "dale". The name of the river is derived from the verb sœkja which means "to seek", and the meaning of the name is "the river which seeks (finds/forces) its way".

Coat of arms
A new coat of arms for the newly enlarged Sogndal Municipality were approved in 2019 for use starting on 1 January 2020. The blue and white arms symbolize a white fjord curving between the mountains. The curving shape is also similar to an "S" which is the first letter of the name of the municipality.

The old coat of arms was granted on 14 December 1984 and was used until 31 December 2019. The arms showed the front of a Viking ship in gold on a blue background. The ship symbolized the nearby naval Battle of Fimreite between King Sverre of Norway and the local King Magnus Erlingsson in the year 1184. The latter was killed together with many nobles of the time.

Churches

The Church of Norway has six parishes within the municipality of Sogndal. It is part of the Sogn prosti (deanery) in the Diocese of Bjørgvin.

The main church of the parish is in Stedje. This is probably one of the oldest church sites in Sogn, probably erected in the first half of the 11th century. The present church was built in 1867, at the same time the old stave church was torn down. A runestone stands near the church, and traces of a Viking settlement have been found nearby.

Sogndal has historically had three sub-parishes (under Stedje): Kaupanger, Norane, and Fjærland. All three of these are also old church sites. The first churches in Kaupanger and Norane were probably built as early as the 11th century and in Fjærland the original church was built around 1600. The present church in Fjærland was built in 1861 and in Norane in 1863. In Kaupanger, the old Stave church from the 12th century is still standing. Excavations show that this was probably the third church on this site. The church was rebuilt in 1862 and lost most of its original character. But today, as a result of a restoration project you will find the church much as it was prior to 1862.

Government
All municipalities in Norway, including Sogndal, are responsible for primary education (through 10th grade), outpatient health services, senior citizen services, unemployment and other social services, zoning, economic development, and municipal roads. The municipality is governed by a municipal council of elected representatives, which in turn elect a mayor.  The municipality falls under the Sogn og Fjordane District Court and the Gulating Court of Appeal.

Municipal council
The municipal council  of Sogndal is made up of 37 representatives that are elected to four year terms. The party breakdown of the council is as follows:

Mayor
The mayor  of Sogndal is a representative of the majority party of the municipal council who is elected to lead the council. The mayors of Sogndal (incomplete list):
2007–present: Jarle Aarvoll (Ap)
2003-2007: Karen Marie Hjelmeseter (Sp)
1994-2003: Jarle Skartun (Sp) 
1988-1993: Trygve Bjørk (Ap) 
1986-1987: Bjørg Rimeslåtten (V) 
1984-1985: Trygve Bjørk (Ap) 
1982-1983: Ivar Falck Husum (Sp)

Education
With more than 2,000 students in the municipality, Sogndal is the educational center of Vestland County. Students from all over Norway come to Sogndal and they create a high level of activity, which is hard to find in places of similar size.

Western Norway University of Applied Sciences is one of the main employers in Sogndal. The Western Norway Research Institute is located within the campus, but it is an independent institution with special expertise in information communication, technology systems, environmental research, and organizational research. In addition to the University College, Sogndal has a large upper secondary school and the oldest continuously running folk high school in the country.

History

Subsistence farming
Sogndal is an old dwelling place. Archaeological excavations indicate that people have been living there as far back as 700 BC. The first farms in Sogndal date back to the 1st century AD and findings indicate that these were rich farms.
Since ancient time, agriculture has been the most important trade in Sogndal. Traditionally grain cultivation and animal husbandry were the most important, but forestry and fruit growing were also common. Fruit, especially apples, have been grown as far back as there are written sources. In the historical records of King Sverre (12th century) there are words and names indicating that apples have been grown in this area.

Industrial revolution

The largest settlement of Sogndal, Sogndalsfjøra, has a long and remarkable history as a seaside settlement. It probably served as the center of the parish for centuries, with general stores and bakeries testifying to its early importance as a center of commerce and trade.

This was a community characterized by vigorous activity. There were boat landings for farmers living alongside the fjord, military functions were established here, and later on, house owners would rent rooms to the first students of the newly established folk high school. Legal assemblies were held at Hofslund, the vicar lived just nearby, and the church was located within sight at Stedje.

Sogndalsfjøra was inhabited as early as the 17th century. By 1701, the number of permanent residents had reached 60–70, mainly people who did not own property but made their living as day laborers. A century later, the population had increased to 222, and by 1900, 422 residents were registered.

Towards the end of the 19th century, the industrial base had been widened and strengthened. In 1881, there were house painters, a goldsmith, saddlers, carpenters, shoemakers, watchmakers, a tinker, and a butcher. Ten years later, Sogndalsfjøra had its own insurance agent, a telephone operator, an ”automobile chauffeur”, a photographer, and a printer. Sogndalsfjøra was no longer a slum, it was becoming a center of trade, commerce and education.

Sogndal has never been a typical industrial community. Later, a wool mill and a bottling plant for soft drinks and fruit juices were added. In 1911, a hydroelectric power station with a 200 kilowatt generator was built here. This was one of the region's first power stations, in fact one of the first in rural Norway.

On the other side of the river is the Stedje Mill, a turbine-driven grain mill that was of great importance to Sogndal and the neighboring parishes during the early 20th century. It was established in 1893 and remained in use until the 1960s, owned and run by the same family through three generations.

Geography
Sogndal is located on the northern shore of the large Sognefjorden, surrounding the Sogndalsfjorden which branches off the main fjord. Northern Sogndal surrounds the inner part of the Fjærlandsfjorden. The municipality is cut in half by mountains and the Frudal Tunnel connects the southern (more populous) part of Sogndal to the Fjærland area in the north. The Fjærland area is surrounded by mountains and water. The only other access to the Fjærland area comes via the Fjærland Tunnel which connects to Jølster municipality to the north.

The Jostedalsbreen National Park lies in the far northern part of the municipality. The Jostedalsbreen glacier is partially located in Sogndal, and it has several small glacial arms inside Sogndal: Bøyabreen, Jostefonn, and Supphellebreen.

The municipality of Luster lies to the northeast and east; Jølster municipality lies to the northwest; Gaular, Leikanger, and Balestrand municipalities lie to the west; Vik and Lærdal municipalities lie to the south (across the Sognefjorden).

Climate
Due to vast topographical differences, the climate of Sogndal varies from temperate oceanic (Cfb) at sea level along the Sognefjord to subarctic (Dfc) at higher elevations to alpine tundra at the high elevations in the mountains above the treeline (above 900 m ASL). 
The wettest season is September - January, while the driest season is April - August. The all-time high at Njøs  is from July 2019, and the all-time low  was recorded January 1987 at an earlier station in Leikanger, close to Njøs.

The Norwegian meteorological office runs several stations in the municipality. Fjærland is situated near the head of a long and narrow fjord branch with less oceanic influences and surrounded by high mountains with Norway's largest glacier nearby. There is also a station at Sogndal Airport, situated at 497 m ASL.

Economy
Agriculture has always played a major role in the municipality of Sogndal. Traditionally, the industries in Sogndal have been centered around the processing of agricultural and forestry products.

Industrial park
The Kaupanger Industrial Park is home to several large companies. Lerum Industries A/S, a producer of lemonade, syrup, juice, and jam, is a cornerstone company in Sogndal, and it is also the largest factory of its kind in Norway. Gilde is a meat processing company specializing in cured meat products. Together with Lerum it constitutes the majority of the traditional industry in Sogndal. Many of the public service functions for the region are also located in Sogndal.

River fishing
Fishing permits (for salmon fishing) are sold for use on specific rivers, including Årøy-elva.

Shopping
Sogndal is the shopping and retail center for the surrounding region which has about 30,000 inhabitants. There are about 70 shops in the compact center of Sogndalsfjøra. Many of these shops are located in the new, modern shopping mall called Sogningen Storsenter.

Sports

Sogndal football
Sogndal has excellent sports accommodations for both indoor and outdoor sports and can offer a great variety of activities. On the national level, Sogndal Fotball (soccer), which plays at Fosshaugane stadium is well known. Sogndal Fotball (formerly Sogndal IL), plays in the Norwegian Second Division (1. Divisjon), which is the second tier of Norwegian football. In spite of the small size of Sogndalsfjøra and the low population of the municipality, Sogndal has managed to spend several seasons in Norway's top division.

Sognahallen
There is room for both competitive and recreational sports, and Sognahallen is the main sports arena in Sogndal. In cooperation with the Norwegian State College for Physical Education and Sport, Sognahallen has established a great scientific sports centre. This sports centre consists of a strength training studio, an aerobic hall, and a spinning hall. Together with the Western Norway University of Applied Sciences, Sognahallen has good facilities for sports education, rehabilitation, and testing.

Attractions
 De Heibergske Samlinger – Sogn Folkemuseum and Sogn Fjordmuseum at Kaupanger. It demonstrate life along the Sognefjord in the 18th century to present.
 Kaupanger stavkyrkje - the biggest Stave church in the Sognefjord region, built around 1190.
 Norsk Bremuseum in Fjærland – a museum with “hands on” activities which has won many awards and where you can learn about snow, ice and glaciers.
 Den norske bokbyen in Fjærland - various second hand bookshops, antique stores, and book cafes.

Notable residents

Public thinking & public service 

 Melchior Falch (1720 in Sogndal – 1791) a jurist, magistrate and fisheries promoter
 Niels Johannesen Loftesnæs (1789 in Sogndal – 1848) a farmer, soldier and rep. at the Norwegian Constitutional Assembly
 Hans Paludan Smith Schreuder (1817 in Sogndal - 1882) a missionary with the Zulu Kingdom
 Jens Andreas Friis (1821 in Sogndal – 1896) a philologist, lexicographer, university professor and a prominent linguist in the languages spoken by the Sami people
 Andreas Leigh Aabel (1830 in Sogndal – 1901) a Norwegian physician and poet
 Harald Sverdrup (1888 in Sogndal – 1957) an oceanographer and meteorologist and director of the Norwegian Polar Institute
 Liv Signe Navarsete (born 1958 in Sogndal) a tempestuous politician, Party leader & minister

The Arts 

 Gjest Baardsen (1791 in Sogndalsfjøra - 1849), an outlaw, jail-breaker, non-fiction writer, songwriter and memoirist
 Minda Ramm (1859 in Sogndal – 1924) a Norwegian novelist, translator and literary critic
 Olav Stedje (born 1953) (born 1953 in Sogndal) a Norwegian soft rock singer-songwriter
 Tone Damli Aaberge (born 1988 in Sogndal) a Norwegian singer-songwriter and actress 
 Windir (1994–2004) a Norwegian sognametal band whose members originated in Sogndal
 Eva & The Heartmaker (formed 2006) a musical duo of Eva Weel Skram and Thomas Stenersen

Sport 

 Eirik Bakke (born 1977 in Sogndal) a retired footballer with 386 club caps and 27 for Norway
 Thea Bjelde (born 2000 in Sogndal) a footballer with over 100 club caps and over 50 for Norway
 Terje Skjeldestad (born 1978 in Sogndal) a retired goalkeeper with 244 caps with Sogndal Fotball
 Anders Stadheim (born 1980 in Sogndal) a former footballer with over 200 club caps 
 Oddbjørn Skartun (born 1989 in Sogndal) a Norwegian footballer with over 200 club caps 
 Kristian Opseth (born 1990 in Kaupanger) a Norwegian footballer with almost 200 club caps
and

References

External links

Municipal fact sheet from Statistics Norway 
NRK Municipality encyclopedia
Official Website of Sogndal
A detailed panoramic view of Sogndal

 
Municipalities of Vestland
1838 establishments in Norway